Craig M. Crews (born June 1, 1964) is an American scientist at Yale University. He is the John C. Malone Professor of Molecular, Cellular, and Developmental Biology, and also holds joint appointments in the departments of Chemistry and Pharmacology. Crews is the Executive Director of the Yale Center for Molecular Discovery and a former Editor of the journal Cell Chemical Biology. His research interests focus on chemical biology, particularly on controlled proteostasis. Crews is a pioneer in the field of targeted protein degradation and his lab's research led to the development of the anti-cancer drug carfilzomib (Kyprolis). He is the founder of Arvinas, the first biotechnology company to bring PROTAC drugs into clinical trials. In 2019, he was named an American Cancer Society Research Professor at the Yale University.

Education and training
Crews graduated from the University of Virginia in 1986 with a bachelor's degree in chemistry, after which he performed research at the University of Tübingen as a German Academic Exchange Service (DAAD) Fellow. As a graduate student in the laboratory of Raymond Erikson at Harvard University, Crews purified and cloned the MAP kinase kinase MEK1, a key kinase that controls cell growth. He subsequently worked in the research group of Stuart Schreiber as a Cancer Research Institute Fellow before joining the faculty of Yale University as an assistant professor in Molecular, Cellular, and Developmental Biology in 1995.

Research
Crews studies controlled proteostasis, i.e., the pharmacological modulation of protein turnover. In 2001, Crews developed, in collaboration with Ray Deshaies, proteolysis targeting chimeras (PROTACs), a new technology to induce proteolysis. PROTACs are dimeric molecules that recruit specific intracellular proteins to the cellular quality control machinery (i.e., an E3 ubiquitin ligase) in a catalytic manner for subsequent removal by the proteasome. This technology has the potential to allow pharmacological targeting of proteins previously thought "undruggable" including many responsible for drug resistance in cancer. Excitement around the field has resulted in much private and public investment in therapeutic approaches based on targeted protein degradation. Prior to its work on PROTACs, the Crews lab’s synthesis and mode of action studies of the natural product epoxomicin revealed that it is a potent and selective proteasome inhibitor. Subsequent medicinal chemistry efforts produced the epoxyketone containing proteasome inhibitor YU101, which served as the basis for the multiple myeloma drug carfilzomib.

Arvinas
In 2013, Crews founded New Haven-based Arvinas, which uses the PROTAC protein degradation technology from his lab to develop drugs to treat cancer, neurodegeneration, and other diseases. In 2019, Arvinas presented initial safety, tolerability, and pharmacokinetic data from the company’s ongoing Phase 1 clinical trials of two orally bioavailable PROTACs, targeting the Androgen Receptor (ARV-110) and the Estrogen Receptor (ARV-471). Both drugs appeared to be well tolerated and no dose-limiting toxicities or grade 2, 3 or 4 adverse events were observed. Moreover, ongoing clinical trials have demonstrated evidence of efficacy, e.g., target protein level reduction and tumor shrinkage in some patients.

Proteolix
In 2003, Crews co-founded the biotechnology company Proteolix to develop YU101, the next generation proteasome inhibitor from his lab, which ultimately became carfilzomib (Kyprolis), which was approved by the FDA in 2012 for use in patients with multiple myeloma. Based on successful Phase II trials of carfilzomib, Onyx Pharmaceuticals acquired Proteolix in 2009 and was itself acquired by Amgen in 2013.

Awards and recognition
2021: Honorary Doctoral Degree, Technische Universität Dortmund, Germany (doctor rerum naturalium honoris causa)
2020: Swedish Pharmaceutical Society Scheele Award
2020: Boehringer Ingelheim Foundation Heinrich Wieland Prize
2019: American Cancer Society Research Professorship
2019: Pharmacia-ASPET Award for Experimental Therapeutics
2018: Pierre Fabre Award
2018: Royal Society of Chemistry Khorana Prize
2017: AACR Award for Outstanding Achievement in Chemistry in Cancer Research 
2015: Inaugural Recipient of the National Cancer Institute Outstanding Investigator Award (R35)
2014: UCB-Ehrlich Award for Excellence in Medicinal Chemistry
2013: CURE Entrepreneur of the Year Award

Publications 

 </ref>

References

External links 
Crews lab
Yale Center for Molecular Discovery
Arvinas, LLC.

Living people
Yale University faculty
American biochemists
Harvard University alumni
1964 births
University of Virginia alumni